Shenavan may refer to:
Shenavan, Aragatsotn, Armenia
Shenavan, Armavir, Armenia
Shenavan, Lori, Armenia